Alfred Carmichael (birth unknown – death unknown), also known by the nickname of "Bunker", was an English professional rugby league footballer who played in the 1900s and 1910s. He played at representative level for England, and at club level for Hull Kingston Rovers (Heritage No.), as a goal-kicking , i.e. number 1.

Playing career

County Cup Final appearances
Alf Carmichael won a cap for England while at Hull Kingston Rovers in 1913 against Wales.

County Cup Final appearances
Alf Carmichael played , and scored 2-goals in Hull Kingston Rovers' 10–22 defeat by Huddersfield in the 1911–12 Yorkshire County Cup Final during the 1911–12 season at Belle Vue, Wakefield on Saturday 25 November 1911, in front of a crowd of 20,000.

Career records
Alf Carmichael was the top point scorer for both the 1910–11 and 1911–12 seasons, and he still jointly holds Hull Kingston Rovers' "Goals In A Match" record, with 14 goals, along with Mike Fletcher, Colin Armstrong and Damien Couturier. He scored 10-conversions, and 4-drop goals against Merthyr Tydfil RLFC on Saturday 8 October 1910.

Genealogical information
Alf Carmichael was the father of the rugby league footballer; George Carmichael.

References

External links
 (archived by web.archive.org) Hull Kingston Rovers ~ Captains

England national rugby league team players
English rugby league players
Hull Kingston Rovers players
Place of birth missing
Place of death missing
Rugby league fullbacks
Year of birth missing
Year of death missing